Since its inception, the Royal National Lifeboat Institution (RNLI) has provided lifeboats to lifeboat stations in the United Kingdom and Ireland.

Once past their operation life, the boats have mostly been sold by the RNLI and purchased for domestic use, marine businesses for usage such as further sea lifesaving functions, diving, fishing and pleasure trips or to maritime lifesaving institutions from other countries to continue a lifesaving role. Some lifeboats of particular historic note have been preserved in museums.

History of lifeboats

The Royal Institution for the Preservation of Life from Shipwreck (RNIPLS) was founded in March 1824.  The RNIPLS provided lifeboats to local committees, the Coastguard and harbour authorities.  The Duke of Northumberland financed a competition for a standard design of a lifeboat. The winner was William Plenty, of Newbury, Berkshire.  These "pulling boats" (rowing) were between 18 and 26 feet in length and were powered by between 4 and 10 oars.  They had cork in their hull and shaped air-cases fore and aft.  Their double-ended designs could operate a rudder from either end, so there was no need to turn.

The RNIPLS suffered from lack of funds and poor organization.  Following the loss of the RNIPLS lifeboat Providence and 20 of her crew of 24 in the mouth of the river Tyne in December 1849, the need for reorganisation was recognised.   Algernon Percy, 4th Duke of Northumberland, then First Lord of the Admiralty, took control.  Richard Lewis was appointed secretary.  The RNIPLS was replaced by the RNLI. Plenty's design was retired and a new design was introduced.  These were larger, self-righting boats. They had a narrow beam, were 34 or 35 feet long with higher end-boxes containing the air-cases and were tested to self-right when capsized.

Later lifeboats were increased in length and were optionally powered by sail.  Motors were introduced in the early 1900s.  They had a greater range, facilitating the merging of lifeboat stations.   Innovation in the design of lifeboats is continuous.

In 1962 the need for inshore lifeboats (ILB) was recognised.  A French design was adopted, this was an inflatable of 16 foot length and a 40 hp engine with  a speed of 20 knots and introduced as the D Class.  It was faster than conventional lifeboats, at that time, could traverse shallow waters, go alongside persons in the water without harming them, and the running costs were much less than conventional lifeboats. In 1972 a rigid inflatable boat (RIB) was developed at Atlantic College in South Wales and introduced as the B Class Atlantic 21.

Historic lifeboat classes

Many lifeboat designs were named after their designers or the area of the UK they came from. More recently they have been named after rivers of the UK and Ireland: in 2019 the current larger all-weather boats were Shannon, Tamar, Severn, Trent and Mersey. Each class has several designs and lengths and their means of power ranges from early rowing, sailing, steam, petrol and now diesel.

 A-class
 Hatch-class lifeboat
 McLachlan-class lifeboat
 Boston Whaler-class lifeboat
 
 B-class
Atlantic 21-class lifeboat
 Barnett-class lifeboat
 Brede-class lifeboat
 C-class (Zodiac IV)
 Clyde-class lifeboat
 Cromer-class lifeboat
 D-class
D-class lifeboat (RFD PB16)
 D-class lifeboat (Avon S650) - only 4 of these craft were used by the RNLI.
 D-class lifeboat (Zodiac III)
 D-class lifeboat (EA16)
 Greathead-class lifeboat
Designed by Henry Greathead, the vessel was 30 feet long and designed to be rowed by a crew of 12. It was double-ended and featured ample amounts of cork lining. However, it also had a heavy keel for stability, as well as a long steering oar, and could be rowed in either direction. Greathead's lifeboat eventually came to be used in 10 different countries, and at least one British boat remained in service for 40 years.
 Keith Nelson type lifeboat
 Liverpool-class Pulling and Sailing
A non-self righting type of lifeboat of various dimensions and various numbers of oars used by the Royal National Lifeboat Institution (RNLI) in the early part of the 20th century. Typically they were launched from carriages into the sea.
 Liverpool-class motorised lifeboat
Used by the RNLI from the 1930s up to the 1980s. Two types appeared: single screw boat and twin screw boat introduced in 1945 as a more powerful version of the single screwed lifeboats.
 Medina-class lifeboat
A prototype of a Rigid Inflatable Boat. The third that was built, funded by the RNLI, was powered by twin 285hp Caterpillar engines the Medina was capable of 28 knots using "jet" drives delivering a tonne of water per second to the nozzles at the rear of the boat.
 Norfolk and Suffolk-class lifeboat
Norfolk and Suffold class boats were able to operate further from shore and around the sandbanks common off East Anglia. James Steven No.14 Lifeboat is a surviving example.
Alfred Corry built Gt Yarmouth 1893. 44 ft Two-masted with oars, non-self righting. The James Stephen No.14  was fitted with a engine
 North Country type - based on Greathead's design
 Oakley-class lifeboat
 Peake-class lifeboat
 Ramsgate-class lifeboat
 Rother-class lifeboat - the last timber hulled lifeboat designed for the RNLI.
 35ft 6in Self-righting motor-class lifeboat
 Solent-class lifeboat
 Surf-class lifeboat
 Thames-class lifeboat
 Tubular rowing boat
 Tyne-class lifeboat 
 Watson-class lifeboat
 Waveney-class lifeboat

Operational lifeboat classes 

Tenders

 X-class lifeboat - Unpowered tender normally found carried on board Tyne-class lifeboats, and is a station option on Mersey and Shannon lifeboats.
XP-class lifeboat - Small powered tender normally found carried on board the Trent-class lifeboat.
Y-class lifeboat - Small powered tender normally found on the Severn-class and Tamar-class lifeboats.

Historic Lifeboat Owners Association
The Historic Lifeboat Owners Association has been set up for individuals who own, maintain, crew or have a general interest in historic lifeboats. The association is a community whereby people can share knowledge, experience, information and advise on the subject, organizes social events and historic lifeboat rallies.

At the beginning of each summer an ex-lifeboat rally is held at Fowey in Cornwall whereby owners bring their boats and display them to the public; this event is organized by Fowey RNLI and is an opportunity to raise funds for the RNLI. Rallies have also been held in Falmouth, Belfast, Glasgow, Poole and Yarmouth, Isle of Wight.

See also
 List of notable RNLB lifeboats
 List of RNLI stations
 Lifeboat (rescue)
 Search and rescue
 Air-sea rescue
 Inflatable Rescue Boat
 List of Lifeboat Disasters in the British Isles
 James Stevens lifeboats

Notes and references

External links 
Royal National Lifeboat Institution
Historic Lifeboat Owners Association